is a song recorded by Japanese singer Shizuka Kudo. It was released as a single by Pony Canyon on May 21, 1992. The song made its first album appearance on the compilation album, Super Best.

Background
The song was written by Gorō Matsui and composed and produced by Tsugutoshi Gotō, making it the third consecutive single of Kudo to be written and produced by the pair. Lyrically, it describes a protagonist struggling to confess her love which she admits is "turning my heart upside down". The song, which starts with a "freaky" guitar solo, came about when Gotō was randomly playing around with different sounds in the studio one day, fresh out of ideas for new songs. Kudo was praised for delivering vocals that matched the creativity of Gotō's melody.

Chart performance
The single debuted at number five on the Oricon Singles Chart with 49,000 copies in its first week. It slid to number six on its second week, but outsold its first week sales, moving 51,000 copies. It dropped to number ten on its third charting week and was out of the top ten the following week. The single stayed in the top 100 for a total of 13 weeks and ranked at number 95 on the year-end Oricon Singles Chart.

Track listing

Charts

Certification

References

1992 songs
1992 singles
Songs with lyrics by Gorō Matsui
Songs written by Tsugutoshi Gotō
Shizuka Kudo songs
Pony Canyon singles